Adventure in the Night (Spanish: Una aventura en la noche) is a 1948 Mexican mystery film directed by Rolando Aguilar and starring Luis Aguilar, Miroslava and Susana Cora. The film's sets were designed by the art director José Rodríguez Granada. The plot focusses on two friends, a screenwriter and a film director, who  pick up two young women on the road and offer then a lift. They later discover that the women had supposedly died two months earlier.

Cast
 Luis Aguilar as Arturo Centella
 Miroslava as Elena
 Susana Cora as Amparo
 Jorge Reyes as Fernando Novoa
 Arturo Soto Rangel as Capitán de policía
 Manuel R. Ojeda as Profesor W. Castle
 Carlos Villarías as Don Adolfo
 Carlos Riquelme as Hijo de don Adolfo
 Francisco Reiguera as Malachias el mayordomo
 Maruja Grifell as Esposa de Alfonso
 Luisa Rooner as Clarita
 José Arratia as Alfonso
 Daniel Arroyo as Miembro del consejo
 Guillermo Bravo Sosa as Portero
 Enedina Díaz de León as Clienta de la espiritista
 Raúl Guerrero as Cliente espiritista
 Héctor Mateos as Miembro del consejo
 José Pardavé as Hernández
 Ignacio Peón as Cliente espiritista
 Joaquín Roche as Miembro del consejo
 Humberto Rodríguez as Miembro del consejo
 José Romero
 Ceferino Silva as Empleado del profesor
 Manuel Trejo Morales as Doctor

References

Bibliography 
 Lentz, Harris M. Science fiction, horror and fantasy film and television credits. McFarland, 1983.

External links 
 

1948 films
1948 mystery films
Mexican mystery films
1940s Spanish-language films
Films directed by Rolando Aguilar

Mexican black-and-white films
1940s Mexican films